Italy competed at the 1967 Mediterranean Games in Tunis, Tunisia.

Medals

Athletics

Men

Women

See also
 Boxing at the 1967 Mediterranean Games
 Swimming at the 1967 Mediterranean Games
 Volleyball at the 1967 Mediterranean Games

References

External links
 Mediterranean Games Athletic results at Gbrathletics.com
 1967 - TUNIS (TUN) at CIJM web site

Nations at the 1967 Mediterranean Games
1967
Mediterranean Games